Win4Lin is a discontinued proprietary software application for Linux which allowed users to run a copy of Windows 9x, Windows 2000 or Windows XP applications on their Linux desktop. Win4Lin was based on Merge software, a product which changed owners several times until it was bought by Win4Lin Inc. Citing changes in the desktop virtualization industry, the software's publisher, Virtual Bridges, has discontinued Win4Lin Pro.

Products and technology

In 2006, Win4Lin came in three different versions, depending on the virtualization requirements of the user.

 Win4Lin 9x allowed the user to run a full copy of Windows 98 or Windows Me inside a virtual machine.
 Win4Lin Home allowed users to only emulate applications. 
 Win4Lin Pro offered users the ability to install a fully virtualized Windows 2000 or Windows XP.

The Win4Lin 9x/Pro (henceforth the only technology discussed in this section) operates by running Windows applications in a virtual machine. Unlike Wine or CrossOver which are emulation-based, virtualization-based software such as VMware or Win4Lin require users to have a Windows license in order to run applications since they must install a full copy of Windows within the virtual machine.

Unlike VMware, however, Win4Lin provides the virtual guest operating system with access to the native Linux filesystem, and allows the Linux host to access the guest's files even when the virtual machine is not running. In addition to the convenience this offers, Computerworld found in their 2002 review that Win4Lin gained significant performance over VMware by using the native Linux filesystem, but also noted that this approach (unlike VMware's) limited the installation of only one version of Windows on a Win4Lin machine.

When the Win4Lin application starts it displays a window on the Linux desktop which contains the Windows desktop environment. Users can then install or run applications as they normally would from within Windows. Win4Lin supports Linux printers, internet connections, and Windows networking, but , does not support DirectX and by extension most Windows games.

They also offered Win4BSD for FreeBSD.

History

Win4Lin was initially based on Merge software originally developed at Locus Computing Corporation, and which changed hands several times until it ended in the assets of NeTraverse, which were purchased in 2005 by Win4Lin Inc., which introduced Win4Lin Pro Desktop. This was based on a 'tuned' version of QEMU and KQEMU, and it hosted [Windows NT]-versions of Windows.

In June 2006, Win4Lin released Win4VDI for Linux based on the same code base.  Win4VDI for Linux served Microsoft Windows desktops to thin clients from a Linux server.

Virtual Bridges discontinued support for Win4Lin 9x in 2007. The Win4Lin Pro Desktop product ceased to be supported in March 2010.

Reception

Many users reported that the 9x version ran windows software at near-native speed, even on quite low-powered machines, such as Pentium-IIs.

Nicholas Petereley praised Win4Lin in two of his columns in the year 2000, for its significantly faster performance than its competitor VMware.

See also
 x86 virtualization

References

External links
 Win4Lin 5.0 makes big improvements, Linux.com, 2008
 Win4Lin Pro Desktop 4.0 lags behind free alternatives, Linux.com, 2007
 Break the Hardware Upgrade Cycle with Win4Lin Windows Virtual Desktop Server, Linux Journal, 2007
 Run Windows On Linux: Win4Lin Revisited [Win4Lin Pro 3.0 review], Tom's Hardware, 2006
 INQUIRER helps debug Win4Lin Pro [2.7], The Inquirer, 2006
  Product Review — Running Windows on Linux, Win4Lin 2.7 vs. VMware Workstation 5.5.1., Open Source Magazine, 2006
 Review: Win4Lin Pro [2.0], Linux.com, 2005
 A Look at Win4Lin 5.1, OSNews, 2004
 Review of Win4Lin 4.0, OSNews, 2002
 VMware Express 2.0 and Win4Lin 2.0: A Comparison Review, Linux Journal, 2001
 TreLOS's Win4Lin (2000)

Virtualization software
Linux emulation software
Discontinued software